August Hlond (5 July 1881 – 22 October 1948) was a Polish cardinal of the Roman Catholic Church, who was Archbishop of Poznań and Gniezno in 1926 and Primate of Poland. He was then appointed as the Archbishop of Gniezno and Warsaw in 1946.

He was the only member of the College of Cardinals to be arrested and taken into custody by the Gestapo during World War II, and for the final years of his life was a critic of the Soviet-backed Communist regime in Poland.

His cause of canonization commenced in 1992 and he was granted the title of Servant of God; on 19 May 2018 he was named Venerable after Pope Francis confirmed his heroic virtue.

Early life and ordination
Second son of a railway worker, he was born in the Upper Silesian village Brzęczkowice, then ruled by Germany, now part of Mysłowice, on 5 July 1881. At twelve-years-of-age, Hlond went to Turin, Italy to study for the priesthood in the Salesian Congregation. He later studied a doctorate of philosophy in Rome, returned to Poland to complete Theology, and was ordained in Cracow in 1905.

In 1909 Hlond was sent to Vienna to be headmaster at a boy's secondary school. He remained in the city for 13 years, and working with spiritual and charitable organisations for Poles, and becoming Provincial of the Salesians for Austria, Hungary and Germany in 1919. Following the break up of Austria-Hungary after World War I, Pope Pius XI appointed Hlond as Apostolic Administrator for Polish Upper Silesia in 1922, and Hlond became the first Bishop of the Diocese of Katowice in 1925.

Bishop and cardinal
Hlond was consecrated as Bishop of Katowice on 3 January 1926. He succeeded Cardinal Edmund Dalbor, as Primate of Poland soon after and in 1927, was appointed as Cardinal-Priest of Santa Maria della Pace by Pope Pius XI. Through the tumultuous 1930s, Hlond condemned "escapism" and called on the Church should challenge the evil realities of the times, and, speaking 12 languages, became an influential member of the College of Cardinals on the international stage.

In 1932, together with Father Ignacy Posadzy founded the Society of Christ.

World War II

The invasion of predominantly Catholic Poland by Nazi Germany in 1939 ignited the Second World War. The Nazi plan for Poland entailed the destruction of the Polish nation, which necessarily required attacking the Polish Church, particularly in those areas annexed to Germany. In the territories annexed to Greater Germany, the Nazis set about systematically dismantling the Catholic Church - arresting its leaders, exiling its clergymen, closing its churches, monasteries and convents. Many clergymen were murdered. Elsewhere in occupied Poland, the suppression was less severe, though still harsh. The Papal Nuncio to Poland, Fillipo Cortesi 
, had abandoned Warsaw along with the diplomatic corps, after the invasion. Other channels existed for communications, including Cardinal Hlond.

On 18 September 1939, at the request of the Polish Government, Hlond left Poland, with part of the Army, in order to reach Rome and report on the actions of the Nazis in Poland, and inform the world via Vatican radio and press. Hlond submitted an official account of the persecutions of the Polish Church to the Vatican, reporting seizures of church property and abuse of clergy and nuns in the annexed regions:

In his final observations for Pope Pius XII, Hlond wrote:

In 1939 Hlond spent several months in Rome for the conclave of 1939. In January 1940, Vatican Radio broadcast Hlond's reports of German persecution of Jews and the Catholic clergy in Poland. These reports were included in the report of the Polish government to the Nuremberg Trials after the war.

In March 1940, Hlond went on a pilgrimage to Lourdes, in France. Following the Fall of France, he remained in the country, staying at the Benedictine Abbey at Hautecombe, in Savoy, where remained, unable to leave, until Himmler ordered the Gestapo to arrest him in February 1944 (the only member of the Sacred College of Cardinals to be arrested by the Nazis). The Gestapo held him at their headquarters in Paris for two months, and, with the Soviet armies now driving the Nazis back from Russia, attempted to have him declare public support for the German war against the Soviet Union, in order to secure his release. The Gestapo offered to make Hlond Regent of Poland, but, according to The Tablet, "The withdrawal of all German troops from Poland was necessary, the Cardinal implacably insisted, before he could even discuss any matter whatsoever with a German officer." Hlond remained in the custody of the Gestapo, first at a convent at Bar-le-Duc, until the Allied advance forced the Germans to shift him to Wiedenbrtick, in Westphalia, where he remained for seven months, until released by American troops in 1945. The Americans flew Hlond to Paris, and then to Rome on April 25, finally returning to war ravaged Poland on 20 July 1945.

Hlond reported in August 1941 to the Cardinal Secretary of State, Luigi Maglione, that the Polish people believed Pope Pius XII had abandoned them. This was said in light of the Nazi persecution of the Polish church and clergy.

After the war

Pope Pius XII appointed Hlond as Archbishop of Warsaw, on 4 March 1946 and he was installed on May 30th, amid immense crowds of supporters. The Polish Church faced great challenges: thousands of Polish clergy had been killed by the Nazis, and the Church and the Soviet-sponsored new regime in Poland were soon to clash. Hlond set about placing bishops on the empty Sees and reconnecting the Church with Rome.

He spoke out against the Communist persecution of the Church. He issued a series of Pastoral Letters on behalf of the Polish Church regarding the new Poland, but these faced censorship at the hands of the new regime, and the government launched a nationalisation of church schools. In a May 1947 Pastoral Letter, Hlond wrote that ""Since the days of St. Peter, the Church has not been subjected to a persecution such as that to which she is subjected today". Following Hlond's death in 1948, The Tablet wrote that "the nations of Eastern Europe which lie today beneath the police-regimes imposed from Moscow lost their most powerful spokesman".

Death and burial
He was buried in the crypt of St. John's cathedral in Warsaw. In March 2006 his body was transferred to the Chapel of St. John the Baptist.

Controversies

Relations with Polish Jews
In 1936, Cardinal Hlond, as Primate of Poland issued a pastoral letter on Catholic moral principles. The long (5,600-word) letter covered Catholic ethics policy, ethics principles and a section on "sins" (Z Naszych Grzechów) that addressed Christian shortcomings to love one's neighbours in accordance with God's law. The latter section included a brief discussion of the "Jewish problem" (Problem żydowski):
So long as Jews remain Jews, a Jewish problem exists and will continue to exist (...) It is a fact that Jews are waging war against the Catholic church, that they are steeped in free-thinking, and constitute the vanguard of atheism, the Bolshevik movement, and revolutionary activity. It is a fact that Jews have a corruptive influence on morals and that their publishing houses are spreading pornography. It is true that Jews are perpetrating fraud, practicing usury, and dealing in prostitution. It is true that, from a religious and ethical point of view, Jewish youth are having a negative influence on the Catholic youth in our schools.

Hlond tempered these remarks with an admission that "not all Jews are this way" and forbade assaults on Jews or attacks on their property: 
There are very many Jews who are believers, honest, just, kind, and philanthropic. There is a healthy, edifying sense of family in very many Jewish homes. We know Jews who are ethically outstanding, noble, and upright. One may love one's own nation more, but one may not hate anyone. Not even Jews. (...) it is forbidden to demolish a Jewish store, damage their merchandise, break windows, or throw things at their homes (...) it is forbidden to assault, beat up, maim, or slander Jews. One should honor and love Jews as human beings and neighbors

Yet, despite a warning to Catholics not to take an anti-Jewish moral stance, interspersed in the letter's words of friendship was an explicit condemnation of Jewish culture and also Judaism for its rejection of Jesus Christ. 
It is good to prefer your own kind when shopping, to avoid Jewish stores and Jewish stalls in the marketplace (...) One should stay away from the harmful moral influence of Jews, keep away from their anti-Christian culture, and especially boycott the Jewish press and demoralizing Jewish publications. (...) We do not honor the indescribable tragedy of that nation, which was the guardian of the idea of the Messiah and from which was born the Savior. When divine mercy enlightens a Jew to sincerely accept his and our Messiah, let us greet him into our Christian ranks with joy.
 
Hlond's letter was criticized by Polish Jewish groups who saw it as offering support and a rationalization for antisemitism.

Another controversy was caused by Hlond's reaction to the Kielce pogrom, that took place in Polish town of Kielce on 4 July 1946. While condemning murders, Hlond denied the racist nature of this crime. He saw the pogrom as a reaction against Jewish bureaucrats allegedly serving Communist regime, a common excuse among Polish antisemites. This position was echoed by Cardinal Sapieha, who was reported to have said that the Jews brought it on themselves.

The American Jewish Committee questioned Pope Francis's decision to name Hlond as Venerable in a letter sent to Cardinal Kurt Koch (the letter was also sent to the CCS and to Cardinal Pietro Parolin). The AJC noted that Hlond was anti-Semitic in his writings. The AJC's letter further argued that, after the 1946 pogrom, Hlond called the Jewish victims communists and said they had themselves to blame.

Removal of ethnic German bishops from Recovered Territories

After 1945, Hlond has been known to force ethnic Germans to resign their church posts in favor of Poles, thereby supporting the Polish integration of formerly eastern German territories that had been given to Poland by the Allies as compensation for territory taken by the Soviet Union.  Maximilian Kaller was one of the bishops who was removed from his diocese and deported to West Germany. Kaller is now in process of beatification. Another bishop forced out was Carl Maria Splett, Bishop of Danzig.

Cause for beatification
The process of beatification commenced in 1992 and he was granted the title of Servant of God. Professor Franz Scholz, a German theologian, as well as many others have expressed their opposition to the proposed beatification of Cardinal Hlond. Scholz opposes his actions against post-war German expellees and civilians from territories ceded by Allies to the Polish Republic.

Documentation (a Positio) was submitted to the Congregation for the Causes of Saints (CCS) in 2008 and on 9 March 2017 a group of nine theologians approved naming Hlond "Venerable" with 8 votes in favor and 1 abstention. The members of the CCS approved the cause on 15 May 2018 and Pope Francis confirmed Hlond's heroic virtue allowing Hlond to be named as Venerable on 19 May.

The current postulator for this cause is the Salesian priest Pierluigi Cameroni.

Hierarchical offices

References

External links 

 Martin Rudner report of letter by Polish Primate Cardinal August Hlond's
 Central Eastern Review:, Jedwabne for Hlond's anti-Jewish statement and Minorities in Poland
 
 
 
 
 Virtual tour Gniezno Cathedral  
List of Primates of Poland 

1881 births
1948 deaths
20th-century venerated Christians
20th-century Polish cardinals
Archbishops of Gniezno
Archbishops of Warsaw
Bishops of Poznań
Bishops of Warmia
Burials at St. John's Archcathedral, Warsaw
People from Mysłowice
People from the Province of Silesia
Polish anti-communists
Polish Servants of God
Pope Pius XII and World War II
Salesians of Don Bosco
Salesian bishops
Salesian cardinals
Society of Christ Fathers
Venerated Catholics by Pope Francis
Antisemitism in Poland
Recipients of the Order of the White Eagle (Poland)